This is a partial list of streets and squares named after Adolf Hitler during the era of Nazi Germany.

The zeal with which German municipal authorities attempted, immediately after the seizure of power, to play their part in the "National Rising" is shown by the practice of conferring honorary municipal citizenship on Hitler, and even more by naming a street (Straße), a square or place (Platz), a promenade (Anlage), an avenue (Damm, Allee), a stadium (Kampfbahn), or a bridge (Brücke) after the new chancellor. As early as March and April 1933, a wave of renamings swept through Germany's cities. Most of the examples in the list come from this period.

Places

Brazil
Before 1931, there are records of a street named Rua Adolpho Hitler in the Campo Belo district of Santo Amaro, Brazil – notably at a time when the Nazis had not yet come to power in Germany. Its name was changed in 1931 to Rua Almirante Barroso, but when Santo Amaro was merged into São Paulo  the next year, the street was again renamed Rua Gil Eanes, due to a homonymous street in Brás. The street still retains Gil Eanes's name.

United States
The planned community German Gardens in Yaphank, New York, was built on the former site of Camp Siegfried, which was owned and operated by the pro-Nazi German-American Bund. Until 1941, several streets were named after prominent Nazis, such as Adolf Hitler Street (renamed Park Street), Goering Street (renamed Oak Street), and Goebbels Street (renamed Northside Avenue).

Notes

References
Christian Zentner, Friedemann Bedürftig (1991). The Encyclopedia of the Third Reich, pp. 6–7. Macmillan, New York. 

Streets Named After Adolf Hitler
Hitler, Adolf
Hitler, Adolf
Streets Named After Adolf Hitler
Streets Named After Adolf Hitler
Streets Named After Adolf Hitler
Streets in Austria
Streets in Germany
Lists of things named after politicians
Hitler